Alex Trembach (born 7 July 1986) is an Israeli sprinter who specializes in the 100 metres.

He competed at the 2008 World Indoor Championships without reaching the final.

His personal best times are 6.69 seconds in the 60 metres (indoor), achieved in February 2008 in Chişinău; and 10.57 seconds in the 100 metres, achieved in June 2008 in Haifa. Also in 2008 he was suspended for 2 years after testing positive for Norandrosterone.

References

1986 births
Living people
Israeli male sprinters
Doping cases in athletics
Israeli sportspeople in doping cases